Andreea Bibiri (born May 3, 1975) is a Romanian film and stage actress, dubber and theatre director. She graduated from the Caragiale Academy of Theatrical Arts and Cinematography in 1996 and has won two UNITER Prize awards as an actress. She is best known outside Romania for the role of Ana, in Tudor Giurgiu's "Of Snails and Men".

Biography
Andreea Bibiri inherited a passion for film from her  father when, before the Romanian Revolution of 1989. He came back from his many travels abroad with new materials of music and movies. 

In the early 90s, Andreea went to the United States for further education but after a short period she returned to Romania to pursue acting. 

She graduated from the Caragiale Academy of Theatrical Arts and Cinematography in 1996 and in the same year, after several roles during university, she made her debut at the Bulandra Theatre with the personage Eleva (The pupil) in The Lesson written by Eugène Ionesco and with her first TV appearance in the film State of Things.

Meanwhile, she increased her theater work, in 1998 she dubbed a character from "The Lion King II: Simba's Pride", the first of many cartoons.

In 2001, she performed at the Bulandra Theatre as the character Sonya in "Uncle Vanya" written by Anton Chekhov. This was one of the most appreciated roles of her career and for which she is nominalized for "The UNITER Award for Best Actress". The show, directed by Yuri Kordonsky, ran successfully at the Festival Internacional Cervantino in Mexico but also in Italy. In 2014, after 13 years from the premiere, it was recorded and broadcast on TVR2.

Sonya and Agafya from Nikolai Gogol's play "Marriage" (2003) are the most enduring roles, surpassing the 150 performances along over a decade.

In 2002, Andreea became better known to a wider audience through the role "Eva Antal" of the first Romanian soap opera "În familie" (In family) produced by Prima TV. She also recorded acoustic performances for radio theater.

In 2004 she received "The UARF Award" for her role in the film "Damen Tango" granted by "The Union of Authors and Film Producers from Romania" and in 2005 at UNITER Gala she won "The Award for Best Supporting Actress" in "Forma lucrurilor", Romanian version of "The Shape of Things" written by Neil LaBute.

The following year, after more than a decade after her theatrical debut, she played her first role as a 'baddie' as Silvia Damian in the telenovela "Daria, iubirea mea" (Daria, my love) produced by Acasă TV. In 2007, Andreea was the winner of "The UNITER Award for Best Actress" for the character Grace in "Purificare", Romanian version of "Cleansed" by Sarah Kane performed at Cluj-Napoca National Theatre.

Between 2010 and 2012 Andreea portrays Ruxandra in the two seasons of the HBO's TV series "În derivǎ" about psychotherapy.

Andreea starred also in the comedy film "Of Snails and Men" that received multiple awards at Valladolid International Film Festival, Warsaw International Film Festival, South East European Film Festival and many more.

In 2013, Andreea began a new phase of her career, debuting as a Theatre director with the shows "Shot sau Comedia relațiilor" (Shot or comedy relations) and "Moș Crǎciun e o jigodie" (Santa Claus Is a Stinker) and in 2014 she performs for the first time the Improvisational Theatre at "Comedy Show" in Bucharest.

In 2016, she played again for TVR 2 the role of Varya in "The Cherry Orchard", the last play by Russian playwright Anton Chekhov.

After 21 years of career at Bucharest's Art Theatre, she performed in her first one-woman play directed by Daniel Grigore-Simion: "A woman alone” by Dario Fo and Franca Rame.

Filmography

Films

TV series

Theatrical works

Radio theater performances

Dubbing works

Awards and nominations

 2001 - Timica Prize at HOP Young Actors Gala 
 2002 - Nomination at UNITER Awards Best Actress for her roles in "Unchiul Vanea (Uncle Vanya)" and "Zi că-i bine! (Tell you that it's okay!)"
 2004 - UARF Award for her role in the film "Damen Tango" granted by "The Union of Authors and Film Producers from Romania" 
 2005 - UNITER Award for Best Supporting Actress for her role in "Forma lucrurilor (The Shape of Things)"
 2007 - UNITER Award Best Actress for her role in "Purificare (Cleansed)"

References

External links
 Andreea Bibiri on Internet Movie Database
 Bulandra.ro - official website

Romanian stage actresses
Romanian film actresses
Romanian theatre directors
Caragiale National University of Theatre and Film alumni
Actresses from Bucharest
1975 births
Living people